Railway station in Beitbridge include:

Maps 
 UN map
 UNHCR map

Town served

Existing 

Bulawayo-Gaborone main line:
 Bulawayo
 Plumtree

Beira–Bulawayo railway (Machipanda railway)
 Bulawayo
 Somabhula
 Gweru
 Kadoma
 Harare
 Marondera
 Nyazura
 Mutare

Limpopo railway (Gweru-Maputo railway)
 Somabhula/Gweru
 Zvishavane
 Rutenga - junction to Beitbridge
  Sango/Niangambe - border station
 Chicualacuala (formerly Malvernia) - border with  Zimbabwe

Beitbridge Bulawayo Railway
 Esigodini
 Mbalabala
 Mazunga
  Beitbridge - border
  Messina

Lowveld Railway
 Mbizi - junction
 Triangle
 Chiredzi
 Nandi - mill; terminus

Proposed 

 Harare
 (rehabilitate)
 Chinhoyi
 (new construction 235 km)
 Chirundu - on Zambezi River
  
 (possible extension 85 km)
  Lusaka - capital

  Hwange possible coal mines.
  Technobanine Point near Maputo.

Upgrade 

 East African Railway Master Plan

See also 

 Transport in Zimbabwe
 National Railways of Zimbabwe

References 

 
Railway stations
Railway stations